Savkovskaya is a rural locality (a village) in Razinskoye Rural Settlement, Kharovsky District, Vologda Oblast, Russia. The population was 29 as of 2002.

Geography 
Savkovskaya is located 45 km north of Kharovsk (the district's administrative centre) by road. Krasnaya Gorka is the nearest rural locality.

References 

Rural localities in Kharovsky District